The Hibernian Catholic Benefit Society is a friendly society in New Zealand, with a former associated credit union. It was created in 1869.

After a large case of fraud occurring over several years through the early 2000s, in which an employee stole an estimated $1.24 million in society money, the associated credit union had to be wound up, and the society had to default on a large amount of the moneys held for its depositors. However, the society noted that it would continue to exist and strive to fulfill its aims.

References

External links 
Official link

Banking in New Zealand
Friendly societies
Religious organisations based in New Zealand
Catholicism in New Zealand
1869 establishments in New Zealand